The 1984 PBA Second All-Filipino Conference Finals was the best-of-5 basketball championship series of the 1984 PBA Second All-Filipino Conference, and the conclusion of the conference playoffs. The Great Taste Coffee Makers and Beer Hausen Brewmasters played for the 28th championship contested by the league.

Great Taste Coffee Makers won their finals series against Beer Hausen via 3–0 sweep for their first-ever PBA title.

Qualification

Games summary

Game 1

The Coffee Makers went on to lead by as much as 16 points in the third quarter at 57–41. The Brewmasters rallied to within five, 76–81. A 13–6 flurry sparked by Manny Victorino and Arnie Tuadles settled the issue for Great Taste, 99–86, with 49 seconds left, from an 86–80 count.

Game 2

Game 3

Rosters

Broadcast notes

References

Great Taste Coffee Makers games
1984 2
1984 PBA season
PBA Second All-Filipino Conference Finals
PBA Second All-Filipino Conference Finals